This article has the discography of Jenny Morris, a New Zealand-born, Australian-based singer and songwriter. She has released six studio albums, three video albums and twenty-five singles, in addition to two compilation albums on record labels WEA, EastWest, rooART, Yep! and Liberation Blue.

Morris' first success came with New Zealand band The Crocodiles, who had a top 20 hit single with "Tears". Re-locating to Sydney, Australia in February 1981, she became a back-up vocalist for INXS before going on to a successful solo career. Her Australian top 5 ARIA Albums are Shiver in 1989 and Honeychild in 1991, and her top 5 ARIA Singles are "She Has to Be Loved" and "Break in the Weather".

Albums

Studio albums

Compilation albums

Soundtracks

Singles

Video albums

Other appearances

Various artists
 1989 – Two ("I Wish I Was a Little Grub", "Isn't It Funny") ABC Records
 1989 – Six ("Papa oom mow mow") ABC Records
 1996 – Mantra Mix ("Rhythm and Flow")
 1998 – Good Vibrations – A Concert for Marc Hunter ("O Zambezi", "In Too Deep")
 1999 – The Underwater Melon Man
 2002 – The Women at the Well ("Beggar on the Street of Love" – Track 14)

Session musician
 1982 – Geoff Chunn – Tracks
 1983 – I Am Joe's Music – I Am Joe's Music
 1983 – Models – The Pleasure of Your Company
 1984 – D.D. Smash – The Optimist
 1984 – INXS – The Swing
 1984 – Dropbears – Dropbears
 1984 – INXS – Dekadance ("Jackson" duet with Michael Hutchence)
 1989 – Various – ABC Children's Series No 2
 1997 – Moondog – Moondog

Music Videos
 "Any Day of the Week" w The Crocodiles (1980)
 "Tears" w The Crocodiles (1980)
 "Hello Girl" w The Crocodiles (1980)
 "Telephone Lover" w The Crocodiles (1980)
 "Everywhere I Go" w QED (1983)
 "Solo and More" w QED (1984)
 "This One" w QED (1984)
 "Get Some Humour" (1985)
 "You're Gonna Get Hurt" (1986)
 "Body and Soul" (1987)
 "You I Know" (1987)
 "Lighthearted" (1987)
 "Are You Ready"(1987)
 "Saved Me" (1989)
 "She Has To Be Loved" (1989)
 "Street of Love" (1989)
 "Self Deceiver" (1990)
 "Break in the Weather" (1991)
 "I've Had You" (1991)
 "Zero" (1992)
 "Crackerjack Man" (1992)
 "Tears" (1992)
 "The Price I Pay" (1993)
 "Only We Can Hear" (1994)
 "In Too Deep" (1995)
 "Downtime" (2002)

References

Discographies of Australian artists